Tej is an Ethiopian mead or honey wine.

Tej or TEJ may also refer to:

 TEJ - short for Tropical Easterly Jet
 Panchakanya Tej (TEJ), franchise team in the Nepal Premier League
 Tej Bahadur Sapru (1875–1949), lawyer and political leader
Ram Charan Tej, Indian film actor
Tej, a character from The Fast and the Furious film series
The Hungarian word for milk (Tej)